Jeff Jordan (born May 29, 1956) is an American bobsledder. He competed in the four man event at the 1980 Winter Olympics.

References

1956 births
Living people
American male bobsledders
Olympic bobsledders of the United States
Bobsledders at the 1980 Winter Olympics
People from Rockville Centre, New York